Roque Valero Pérez (born January 31, 1974) is a Venezuelan singer, actor and politician.

Biography
Roque was born to parents Roque Valero and Rosario Pérez. He began singing at the age of 7 when he joined the cast of a school play titled El día del médico.

In 1983, his family moved to Barquisimeto where he took courses in acting and joined the National youth Orchestra of Lara. His acting coach recommended that he pursue acting further, and he then moved to Caracas to strengthen his acting skills. He studied in several acting workshops under Ricardo Lombardi and Adda Noceti of Grupo Actoral 80 and with Santiago Sánchez. his first acting job was in theater in a play titled La mano written by Oscar Mendoza Herrera.

Career in film and television
In 2002, Valero got the opportunity to star in his first feature film titled La pluma del arcángel written by Luis Manzo. The film won awards and nominations at film festivals in Bogotá, Cartagena and Miami. Later, he returned to television with a supporting role in the Cosita Rica as a composer and performer of its musical theme which was included in his first album titled Cae El Amor released in 2004.

That same year, he starred with Édgar Ramírez in the film Punto y Raya by Elia Schneider, for which he won the best actor award at the Gramado Festival, the Golden Sun (Soleil d'Or) as well as Best Actor in the International Festival of Latin American Cinema of Biarritz, and the Special Jury Prize Award Coral 26vo male performance in the International Festival of New Latin American Cinema in Havana, Cuba.

In 2006, he obtained his first starring role in the telenovela titled Ciudad Bendita where he sang several songs, including the theme song that were included in his second album Todo Va A Salir Bien which was also certified gold and platinum. In 2007 he accompanied Franco De Vita on tour in Colombia and the United States.

He won the Teatro Municipal Award for Best Actor.

In 2008 starred alongside Armando Cabrera and Fabiola Colmenares the musical work of Mel Brooks, The Producers in the Aula Magna of the Universidad Central de Venezuela.

Discography
2004: Cae El Amor
2006: Todo Va A Salir Bien
2008: Pasajeros En Tránsito
2010: Recopilatorio: Insomnio

Telenovela soundtracks
 Nuestra Historia in Cosita Rica (2003)
 Ando de Puntillas in Cosita Rica (2003)
 Vengo a Contar Contigo in Sabor a ti (2004)
 En tú Corazón in El amor las vuelve locas (2005)
 Ciudad Bendita in Ciudad Bendita (2006)
 Cuando te Miro in Ciudad Bendita (2006)
 Las Lágrimas Aprenden a Reír (Creo en Ti) in La vida entera (2008)
 No soy nada (A duo con Yordano) in La vida entera (2008)
 Contra Corriente in Natalia del Mar (2011)

Filmography

Telenovelas
 Ilusiones (1995)
 La Inolvidable (1996)
 A todo corazón (1997)
 Mujercitas (1999)
 Felina (2001) as Agapito
 Lejana como el viento (2002) as Tony
 Cosita Rica (2003) as Cachito
 Se solicita príncipe azul (2005) as Bautista
 Con toda el alma (2005) as Professor Hugo
 Ciudad Bendita (2006) as Juan Lobo
 La vida entera (2008) as Miky Mata
 El árbol de Gabriel (2011) as Epicureo Morales

Films
 La pluma del arcángel (2002) as Lazarillo 
 Punto y Raya (2004) as Cheito
 Bolívar, el hombre de las dificultades (2013) as Bolívar
Allende en su laberinto (2014)

References

External links
 
 Discografía de Roque Valero at 

1974 births
Living people
Male actors from Caracas
Singers from Caracas
Venezuelan male film actors
Venezuelan male telenovela actors
Venezuelan male singer-songwriters
Members of the National Assembly (Venezuela)
Venezuelan actor-politicians